The Mexican Secretariat of the Civil Service (Spanish: Secretaría de la Función Pública, SFP) is the entity of the cabinet of Mexico in charge of coordinating, assessing and monitoring the public exercise of the federal government. It was created in 1982 as the Secretariat of the Comptroller General of the Federation and was known as the Secretary of Accounting and Administrative Development from 1994 to 2003.

After years of inactivity because of the failure to allocate a secretary by the incoming government of Enrique Peña Nieto, the Secretariat was reactivated on February 3, 2015, and said president appointed  as his secretary. Roberto Salcedo Aquino became the current head of the SFP in June 2021.

In recent years, the Secretariat of the Civil Service has done great advancements in developing novel Blockchain based technology and programs to fight corruption.

References

External links 
Official site of the President's Cabinet

Cabinet of Mexico